The 2018–19 Hartford Hawks men's basketball team represented the University of Hartford in the 2018–19 NCAA Division I men's basketball season. They played their home games at the Chase Arena at Reich Family Pavilion in West Hartford, Connecticut and were led by 9th-year head coach John Gallagher. They were members of the America East Conference. They finished the season 18–15, 10–6 in America East play to finish in fourth place. They defeated UMass Lowell in the quarterfinals of the America East tournament before losing in the semifinals to UMBC.

Previous season
The Hawks finished the 2017–18 season 19–14, 11–5 in America East Conference play to finish in third place. In the America East tournament, they defeated New Hampshire in the quarterfinals, before losing in the semifinals to UMBC. They were invited to the CollegeInsider.com Tournament, where they lost in the first round to San Diego.

Roster

Schedule and results

|-
!colspan=12 style=| Non-conference regular season

|-
!colspan=9 style=| America East Conference regular season

|-
!colspan=12 style=| America East tournament
|-

|-

Source

References

Hartford Hawks men's basketball seasons
Hartford Hawks
Hartford